A sulky is a lightweight cart with two wheels and a seat for the driver, generally pulled by horses or dogs. With horses, a sulky is used for harness racing. The term is also used for an arch-mounted cart on wheels or crawler tracks, used in logging, or other types of vehicle having wheels and usually a seat for the driver, such as a plough, lister or cultivator.

Horse sulky

A sulky for horses is a lightweight two-wheeled, single-seat cart that is used as a form of rural transport in many parts of the world. A special development of this is now used in most forms of harness racing in Argentina, Australia, Canada, France, the United States and New Zealand, including both trotting and pacing races. They are reputedly called "sulkies" because the driver must prefer to be alone.

Race sulkies come in two categories,
 Traditional symmetrical sulkies
 Asymmetric or "offset" sulkies

An "improved sulky" with pneumatic tires and adjustable height was patented at the United States Patent Office by W.J. Hamill on August 15, 1893. (see Google patents)
The asymmetric sulky was patented in Australia in the 1980s and came to prominence in 1987 when a two-year-old gelding named Rowleyalla used one to break the then world record for his category, at 3.4 seconds under the existing mark.

In 1990 the asymmetric sulky was introduced into North America, winning seven of its first nine starts at Freehold, NJ. Today the great majority of sulky manufacturers in North America are producing asymmetric sulkies.

An additional sulky type is the "team-to-pole" or "pairs" sulky, a lightweight single seat sulky designed for draft by two horses abreast.

These may also be split into two types:
 Traditional pole and yoke with draft by traces.
 Dorsal hitch with draft direct from the saddle to the yoke and, via the pole, to the sulky.

Of the two, the dorsal hitch pairs sulky is the most recent, holding all current world pairs speed records over the mile to July 31, 2005.

Sulkies used in harness racing

There are two types of sulkies used in harness racing.

 Jog Carts, used only for training, are bigger and bulkier than a racing cart.  These may sometimes be known as Roadcarts. The shafts may be wood, aluminum, steel or stainless steel. They have bigger seats which requires less athleticism to sit upon, and may also seat two. The most modern styles provide full independent suspension by hydraulic dampers and progressive rate coil springs. These give both a smoother ride and higher speeds than traditional types. They are also lighter.
 Race Bikes are the only style allowed to be used in races or qualifying heats.  They are more compact and aerodynamic than a jog cart, have smaller seats that reduce weight, but require more athleticism for the driver to sit upon.  Shafts may be of carbon fibre, aluminum, titanium, stainless steel or, less often, wood.
 Speed Carts have a similar design to race bikes in a single seat and stirrups for the driver, but have road-going tires, mud flaps, longer shafts and are heavier than race bikes. Some may have a limited form of suspension built into the seat. These are usually made of steel and are heavier than race bikes but much lighter than jog carts.

When it rains, or the track has excessive moisture, trainers and drivers are required to put plastic mud flaps on the back of the wheels. All race bikes must comply with the relevant procedures and standards in order to be approved. In no way can a race bike have any component that will directly interfere with another horse or driver.

Dog sulky 
 

Smaller sulkies are also used for dogs, both for racing and as transportation. The dog driving sulkies can be divided into two main types:
 Conventional two-shaft carts attaching to harness on either side of the dog or dogs.
 Single-shaft dorsal hitch carts, which attach to a single point on top of the dog's shoulders.

A further distinction may be made between sulkies with the axles rigidly connected to the vehicle, and those with the axles insulated from the vehicle by springs and dampers. Those with springs and dampers may be further divided into single-axle sprung carts and "independent suspension" sprung and damped carts. Needless to say, those with independent suspension by coil springs and dampers tend to be both more expensive and smoother riding.

Driving sulky construction materials run the full gamut from timber, through powder-coated steel tube, aluminum tube, and stainless steel tube. The very latest types (currently undergoing field tests in California) use nanotechnology-based stainless steels of prodigious strength-to-weight ratio.

The great majority of driving sulkies available have the wheel axles rigidly affixed to the frames. This makes for a rough ride on anything but smooth surfaces such as pavement. But in recent years lightweight, single shaft, independent suspension, driving sulkies have been introduced. These allow safe high speed use in off-road conditions.

The most recent designs are of the single shaft type, as proponents believe that this type gives the dog(s) greater freedom, less possibility of injury, and a quicker and easier training regime. A single shaft dog sulky, made of stainless steel tube and fitted with independent suspension and disc brakes, weighs a little under 18 kg. The highest speed so far recorded in one of these sulkies is 64.8 kilometers per hour.

See also
 Dog carting
 Roadster (horse)
 Types of carriages

References

Animal-powered vehicles
Carts
Dog equipment
Harness racing
Horse driving